Ignaz Kiechle (23 February 1930 in Kempten im Allgäu, Bavaria – 2 December 2003 in Kempten) was a German politician of the Christian Social Union in Bavaria (CSU).

After the 1983 West German federal election, chancellor Helmut Kohl appointed him to 'Minister of Food, Agriculture, and Forestry' (Second Kohl cabinet). After the 1987 election, he had the same position in the Third Kohl cabinet and then, after the German reunification, in the Fourth Kohl cabinet. In January 1993, he left the cabinet because of poor health; Jochen Borchert (CDU) became his successor.

From 1969 to 1994 Kiechle was a member of the Bundestag (German Parliament). 
From 1959 until 1968 he was a farmer leading the farm of his parents.

Kiechle and his wife Cäcilia had four children. Their son Thomas (* 1967) became mayor of Kempten in 2014.

References

1930 births
2003 deaths
Agriculture ministers of Germany
German farmers
Government ministers of Germany
Members of the Bundestag for Bavaria
Members of the Bundestag 1990–1994
People from Kempten im Allgäu
Knights Commander of the Order of Merit of the Federal Republic of Germany
Members of the Bundestag for the Christian Social Union in Bavaria